Sophytes, or Saubhuti was the name of a king in Bactria or the northwestern Indian subcontinent during the time of the Alexander's invasion. Sophytes surrendered to Alexander and was allowed to retain his kingdom. Probably another Sophytes, who was satrap in the eastern territories conquered by Alexander the Great, minted his own coins in the Greek style circa 300 BCE. Rapson and some others have considered them as the same person.

Sophytes the Iranian ruler
Sophytes is described in classical sources as a ruler in the Bactria and Punjab region between the Hydraotes and the Hyphasis in the area of the Salt Range, who submitted to Alexander and was, thereby, permitted to retain his realms. He made a demonstration of four Indian dogs fighting a lion to Alexander.  Sophytes is described as ruling along the Indus during the campaigns of Alexander the Great, in the Bibliotheca of Diodorus Siculus. Curtius also records an interview between the tall and handsome Sophytes and Alexander.

Sophytes is mentioned by Diodorus (XVII.91-92), Curtius (IX.1.24-35) and Arrian (VI.3).

Sophytes the satrap

Possibly another Sophytes is also known from his abundant Greek coinage dated circa 300 BCE. Little is known about him and hypotheses are numerous: Sophytes may have been a Hellenistic satrap who replaced Stasanor in Bactria-Sogdiana, or may have ruled in a neighboring area; he may also have been a Satrap of Arachosia.

His rich and formal Greek coinage is however generally considered as Bactrian due to the distribution of the finds, and due to the coin types, of Athena with owl and eagle reverses, which are a clear continuation of the Attic coinage and the preceding anonymous Bactrian coin types derived from it.  The coinage of Sophytes is often dated to 305-294 BCE

Sophytes may also have been the Mauryan Empire satrap of Arachosia, succeeding Sibyrtius, after Seleucus had ceded the Hellenistic territory of Arachosia to Chandragupta Maurya in the Seleucid–Mauryan war (305–303 BCE).

Ethnicity

Sophytos is not a Greek name. Scholars, including Sylvain Lévi, have suggested, based on Panini, that the name Sophytes may be equated with the name Saubhūti, but there is no conclusive proof of this. It is not clear if this king Sophytes is the same as the individual named Sophytes on coins discovered in the northwest of the Indian subcontinent, or whether he was a later dynast based in Bactria. E.J. Rapson thinks that they are one and the same.

Sophytes has been subject to a lot of speculation, with Indian origin at one end of the spectrum and Greek at the other. Cunningham identifies him with the Indian King Fobnath of "Sangala," (a name some read as "Saka-town") while A. C. L. Carlleyle connects him with the same king's son Suveg, which is more likely in light of the identification of Fobnath as a royal title rather than a name; potentially making him a Madra of Saka/Iranian origin. Cunningham believes the Sobii and Kathaei to have been his subjects, whom he asserts were Turanians, making them of the same stock as the Saka or Indo-Scythians. Sagala was the capital of the later Indo-Greek dynasty of Menander I for several generations, and that Menander himself struck several coins with a similar reverse, suggesting that his dynasty inherited the older king's mints when he took the city for himself.

John D. Grainger however, identifies him as a Greek dynast; Frank L. Holt speculating that he was a mercenary captain who minted coins simply to meet the needs of his troops. In light of his coin type, he may have been a local official, installed (although he may have been an older official, reinstated or simply recognized) by Seleucus after he took the region.

Another Sophytes is known from the Kandahar Sophytos Inscription, who may or not have been related to this Sophytes.

Alexandrian appraisal
According to Strabo, a mining survey by Alexandrian mining engineer Gorgus of  the region under the newly conquered land from Sophytes by Alexander the Great had plenty of gold and silver, implying the lack of expertise in mining technology of the Indians under Sophytes.

Sources
 Age of the Nandas and Mauryas, Nilakantha Shastri, Motilal Banarsidass (1967)
 Hellenism in Ancient India, Gauranga Nath Banerjee, Munshiram Manoharlal.
 Archaeological Survey of India - Report of Tours in the Central Doab and Gorakhpur in 1874-75 and 1875-76, A. C. L. Carrleyle and Maj. General Arthur Cunningham, Calcutta: Office of the Superintendent of Government Printing. 
 Symbols: Their Migration and Universality, Count Eugene Goblet d'Alviella, Dover Publications.
 The Greeks in Bactria and India, Sir W. W. Tarn, Ares Publishers.
 A Seleukid Prosopography and Gazetter, John D. Grainger, Brill.
 Thundering Zeus: The Making of Hellenistic Bactria, Frank L. Holt, University of California Press.

References

External links
 Coins of King Sophytes

Year of birth missing
294 BC deaths
Indo-Greek kings
Euthydemid dynasty